Lawrence W. Sherman (born October 25, 1949) is an American experimental criminologist and police educator who is the founder of evidence-based policing.

Sherman's use of randomized controlled experiments to study deterrence and crime prevention has led him to examine such wide-ranging issues as domestic violence, saturation patrol, gun violence, crack houses, and reintegrative shaming. He has collaborated with over 30 police and justice agencies around the world, and been credited as a key founder of the field of experimental criminology.

Sherman holds the posts of director of the Jerry Lee Centre for Experimental Criminology and Wolfson Professor of Criminology Emeritus at the University of Cambridge, where he is also Chair of the Cambridge Police Executive Program. He is also  the director of the Cambridge Centre for Evidence-Based Policing, and Editor-in-Chief of the Centre's Cambridge Journal of Evidence-Based Policing.

Education
Sherman graduated magna cum laude from Denison University in 1970, with a B.A. in Political Science. He received an M.A. in social science from the University of Chicago in 1970, earned a Diploma in Criminology from Cambridge University in 1973, and received his M.A. and Ph.D.in sociology from Yale University in 1974 and 1976 respectively.

Academic career
Sherman's career began at age 20 in the New York City Mayor's Office and Police Department as an Alfred P. Sloan Foundation New York City Urban Fellow and aide to the NYPD's Police Commissioner Patrick V. Murphy, where he began a long research partnership with NYPD Assistant Chief Tony Bouza. Bouza became the Minneapolis Police Chief in 1980, where he persuaded the City Council to approve Sherman's research design to randomly assign arrest for misdemeanor domestic violence, later known as the Minneapolis Domestic Violence Experiment. Sherman's early experimental research into the influence of arrest on recidivism in spouse abuse led to changes in police department policies and procedures nationwide, encouraged state legislatures to modify state statutes to allow for misdemeanor arrest, and eventually resulted in five federally funded replications, one of which Sherman led in Milwaukee. In the late 1980s, Sherman's discovery of hot spots of crime led to his experimental research with David Weisburd and Tony Bouza that was first to show clear crime prevention effects of directed police patrol in high crime locations. In the early 1990s, Sherman's Kansas City Gun Experiment studied the effect of concentrated police patrol on gun crime and violence and that directed police patrol in gun crime "hot spots" led to an increase in seizures of illegally carried guns and a decrease in gun crimes.

Since 1995, Sherman has been co directing a program of prospective longitudinal experiments in restorative justice involving approximately 2,500 offenders and 2,000 crime victims. He has also  worked on the development of new tools for predicting murder among offenders on probation and parole in Philadelphia, as well as randomized trials of intensive services among highest risk offenders.

From 1999 to 2007, Sherman was Greenfield Professor of Human Relations at the University of Pennsylvania, initially in the Department of Sociology. Under his leadership, Penn became the first Ivy League University to establish a Ph.D. in criminology as a separate field in 2000, and the first to establish a separate department of criminology in 2003, when Sherman was appointed the University's first Professor of Criminology. He served as Chair of the University's Department of Criminology from 2003 to 2007 and as the director of the Fels Institute of Government from 1999 to 2005. He resigned from Penn in June 2010 to return to the University of Maryland as distinguished university professor while jointly serving as Wolfson Professor of Criminology from 2007-2017. Since 2016, he has also served as an honorary professor at the University of Queensland in Brisbane.

Sherman also served Maryland as chair of the Department of Criminology and Criminal Justice from 1995 to 1999, and as a faculty member from 1982 to 1999. In 1987, he was the Seth Boyden Distinguished Visiting Professor at Rutgers University's Graduate School of Criminal Justice and from 1994 to 2016 he served as adjunct professor of law at the Australian National University's Research School of Social Science and later in the ANU School of Global Governance (RegNet). From 1976 to 1980 he was on the faculty of the University at Albany's School of Criminal Justice.

From 2001 to 2007 he was the co-director of the Justice Research Consortium in the United Kingdom. Since 1995 has been the scientific director of RISE, an ongoing research program in partnership with Australian National University and the Australian Federal Police. From 1985 to 1995 he served as president of the Crime Control Institute, and from 1979 to 1985 he was the director of research and later vice president for the Washington, D.C.-based Police Foundation.

In addition to his experimental research, Sherman has published articles and book chapters on a wide variety of topics, including police corruption, police education, police discretion, police crackdowns, restorative justice, investigations, police use of force, and fear reduction. In 1997, Sherman led a team of University of Maryland criminologists in producing Preventing Crime: What Works, What Doesn't, What's Promising, a Congressionally mandated evaluation of over 500 state and local crime prevention programs.

Key research findings
His major discoveries can be summarized as follows:

 In 1980, he discovered that restricting police powers to shoot people was not followed by any increases in crime, or in violence against police officers; this evidence was later cited by the U.S. Supreme Court in its 1985 Tennessee v. Garner decision to restrict police powers to kill across the US.
 In 1984, the Minneapolis Domestic Violence Experiment found that arresting suspects in domestic violence cases was more effective at reducing re-offending than counselling or temporarily separating the suspect and victim.
 In 1987, he discovered that over half of all reported crime and disorder occurred at just 3% of the property addresses in a major city, a finding that has since been consistently replicated in other cities. He showed that exactly where and when crime will occur is far more predictable than anyone had previously thought, thus laying the theoretical and empirical basis for what is now called "hot spots policing," now widely practiced from New York to Sydney.
 In 1995, he discovered that homicides, shootings and other gun crimes could be reduced by intensified but lawful use of police stop and search powers in hot spots of gun crime, a finding that has now been replicated in six out of six independent re-tests by other scholars. This research helped prompt a major change in police practice in the US that was followed by a substantial reduction in the US homicide rate.
 In 1992, he discovered that arrest has contradictory effects on different kinds of domestic violence offenders, causing less violence among employed men but doubling the frequency of violence among men without jobs. This finding has also been replicated by independent scientists, and is now the basis for some women's advocates to recommend abandoning mandatory arrest policies for non-injurious domestic assault.
 In 1995, with his colleague David Weisburd, he demonstrated that doubling or tripling the frequency of police patrols in crime hot spots could reduce street crime by two-thirds. This discovery has been replicated by other scholars as well.
 In 2000, with his colleague Heather Strang (to whom he was married in 2010), he discovered that restorative justice conferences between violent offenders and their victims could reduce repeat offending by half.
 In 2006, with his colleagues Strang, Barnes and Woods, he showed that restorative justice also caused a 400% increase in criminal offending among Australian Aboriginals. He concluded that while restorative justice had been shown in most other places to be effective, it could backfire in some places.
 In 2008, Sherman discovered with Strang that nine ten out of ten of the restorative justice experiments they designed with victims present substantially reduced the overall two-year frequency of repeat convictions or arrests, across a wide range of offence types, offenders, and points in the criminal justice system. This included seven that were independently assessed by Professor Joanna Shapland of Sheffield University.
 In 2009, with Richard A. Berk and others, he discovered that a "data-mining" algorithm can predict which Philadelphia probationers are charged with murder or attempted murder 75 times more often than those the algorithm classifies as low-risk.
 In 2011, he first published his proposal for a "crime harm index" to weight any count of crimes by individuals, groups, cities and countries by the number of days in prison prescribed for each offence type by sentencing guidelines, irrespective of whether anyone is charged or convicted of each reported offence.
 In 2013, he developed the "Triple-T" framework for applying his 1998 model of evidence-based policing, showing how police decision-making could integrate systematic evidence on targeting, testing and tracking the use of police resources.
 In 2014, he discovered with Heather Harris that the long-term effect of arresting domestic abusers on their victims was to increase the victims’ death rate from all natural causes, but not homicide, compared to police warning the offender at the scene, with a doubling in mortality among African-American abuse victims from 5% to 10% over 23 years.
 In 2016, he published with Peter and Eleanor Neyroud the details of the Cambridge Crime Harm Index, a system for measuring multiple crimes in areas or by individuals with the total number of days imprisonment the crime could attract. The Index has since been used in various forms by police agencies in the UK, US, Sweden, Australia, and Uruguay. The paper and the concept won an award from Cambridge University's Vice Chancellor.

Research on the prestige of scholars in criminology and criminal justice has listed Sherman as one of the most highly cited scholars in the field.

Evidence-based policing

In a 1998 Police Foundation lecture, Sherman sketched out the concept of "evidence-based policing," modeled on the ideas of evidence-based medicine. His core idea was that police practice can be made far more effective if all of its complex but repeated elements were tested by repeated controlled field experiments. In February 2000, Sherman co-founded the Campbell collaboration's Crime and Justice Group, which has pursued the synthesis of research evidence on the effectiveness of policing and other crime prevention practices. Since then, the FBI Academy has offered a course on evidence-based policing, and it has become the subject of wide debate and commentary in police practice and research journals.

In 2008, Sherman made evidence-based policing (EBP) the core of the Police Executive Programme at Cambridge University, a part-time course of study for senior police leaders from around the world to earn a Diploma or Master's in applied criminology. In that year, the National Policing Improvement Agency (NPIA) funded the first international conference on EBP, which was attended by police executives from Asia, Australia, Europe and the US. Since then the conference has been held each July, with the 5th International Conference attended by over 250 police and scholars from six continents, including Africa and Latin America.

In 2010, a group of UK police officers founded the Society of Evidence-Based Policing, and elected Sherman its first Honorary President, along with Sir Peter Fahy, Chief Constable of the UK's Greater Manchester Police (see http://sebp.police.uk/index.php); as of 2014 the Society has over 1,000 members, primarily UK police officers but with membership from Australia to Argentina and North America. In 2013, police in collaboration with the University of Queensland established the Australian-New Zealand Society of Evidence-Based Policing, which now has over 500 members (see http://www.anzsebp.com/index.php). In 2015, both Canada (see https://web.archive.org/web/20160304072800/http://www.can-sebp.net/index.php) and the United States (see http://www.evidencebasedpolicing.org/index.php) established their own branches of this learned professional society. In 2013, UK Home Secretary Theresa May appointed Sherman an independent non-executive director of the new College of Policing, which develops and promotes evidence of what works in policing.

Institution building

Sherman has been a prime mover in the development on several permanent new additions to the institutional landscape of criminology. The most visible of these new institutions is the Stockholm Prize in Criminology, which philanthropist Jerry Lee and Sherman proposed to Professor Jerzy Sarnecki of Stockholm University in mid-2000, and which Sarnecki brought to the Swedish Ministry of Justice where it received support from successive Ministers. The annual Prize for criminological research or its application that benefits humanity was funded by the Jerry Lee Foundation for a guaranteed minimum of ten years, with the first prizes awarded in 2006. The Prize has been awarded annually since then, most often presented by a member of the Royal Family, with Sherman and Sarnecki as co-chairs of the International Jury that selects the winners. In 2012, Justice Minister Beatrice Ask concluded an agreement with the Soderberg foundations to provide joint funding with Ministry investment of a permanent endowment for a new Stockholm Prize Foundation, which guarantees annual funding of the Prize in perpetuity.

Sherman has also founded or helped to found the Academy of Experimental Criminology (in 1999), the Division of Experimental Criminology of the American Society of Criminology (in 2009), the Campbell Collaboration and its Crime and Justice Group (in 2000), the first Department of Criminology in the Ivy League—at the University of Pennsylvania (in 2003) and its Ph.D and MA degrees (in 2001), its Master of Science (2004), and its Jerry Lee Center of Criminology (in 2001). He also founded the first centre for experimental criminology in 2008, the Jerry Lee Centre of Experimental Criminology at the University of Cambridge Institute of Criminology.

Former students

Sherman's students have included University of Cincinnati Professor John Eck, University of Pennsylvania Professor John MacDonald, George Mason University Professors Cynthia Lum and Christopher Koper, London School of Economics Professor Meredith Rossner, University of Pennsylvania Research Professor Geoffrey Barnes, and former Thames Valley Police and National Policing Improvement agency Chief Constable Peter Neyroud, President of the American Society of Evidence-Based Policing and working police sergeant Renee J. Mitchell, Matthew T. Mangino, former member of the Pennsylvania Board of Probation and Parole and former district attorney of Lawrence County, Pennsylvania. His currently serving police executive students include   Stephen Williams, Acting Commissioner of Police, Trinidad and Tobago Police Service; from the UK, Chief Constables Sara Thornton (Thames Valley Police), Simon Bailey (Norfolk Constabulary), John Parkinson (West Yorkshire Police), and Assistant Chief Constable Marcus Beale (West Midlands Police); and Police Chief William Farrar, from the Rialto Police Department, California.

Awards and honors

Sherman has been the recipient of numerous honors and awards for his work in the field of criminology and policing. Sherman's work in establishing the Stockholm Prize in Criminology was recognized by the King of Sweden in 2016, who appointed Sherman a Knight "Commander of the Royal Order of the Northern Star" (KNO). In 2017, Yale University Graduate School awarded him a Wilbur Cross Medal for public service, and the University of Bialystok awarded him its medal for services to criminology. In 2011, the Royal Society of Arts in London awarded him its Benjamin Franklin Medal (Royal Society of Arts) for his work on evidence-based crime prevention, and in 2009 he won the Beccaria Gold Medal of the Criminology Society of German-Speaking Countries.  
 
In 2013 the University of Stockholm awarded him an honorary doctorate in social science, and George Mason University presented him its Award for Distinguished Achievement in Evidence-Based Crime Policy. In 2014 Denison University awarded him an honorary Doctorate of Humane Letters.

In 1998 he was elected the founding president of the Academy of Experimental Criminology and in 1999 was elected a fellow of the Academy. In 2006, the Academy presented him with the Joan McCord Award for Outstanding Contributions to Experimental Criminology.

In 1994, Sherman was elected a fellow of the American Society of Criminology. In 1999, he received the Society's Edwin Sutherland Award for outstanding contributions to the field of Criminology. In 2001 he was elected President of the Society. He served as president of the International Society for Criminology from 2000 to 2005  and president of the American Academy of Political and Social Science from 2001 to 2005; the AAPSS also elected him as a Fellow in 2008.

In 1994, the Academy of Criminal Justice Sciences presented Sherman with the Bruce Smith Sr. Award, in recognition of outstanding contributions to criminal justice as an academic or professional endeavor. Sherman received the Distinguished Scholarship Award in Crime, Law and Deviance from the American Sociological Association in 1993, the Lee Jerry Lee Lifetime Achievement Award from American Society of Criminology's Division of Experimental Criminology and the Lifetime Achievement Award of the American Society of Criminology's Division of Policing.

Bibliography

Selected writings

 Lawrence W. Sherman. 2013. "The Rise of Evidence-Based Policing: Targeting, Testing and Tracking." CRIME AND JUSTICE vol. 42, M. Tonry editor, University of Chicago Press, pp. 377–431.
 Lawrence Sherman and Heather Strang. 2007. Restorative Justice: The Evidence. London: Smith Institute, 95 pp.
 Lawrence W. Sherman, David P. Farrington, Brandon Welsh and Doris MacKenzie, eds., Evidence-Based Crime Prevention. London: Routledge, 2002.
 Lawrence W. Sherman, et al. 1997. Preventing Crime: What Works, What Doesn't, What's Promising. Report to the U.S. Congress. Washington, D.C.: U.S. Dept. of Justice, 655 pp.
 Lawrence W. Sherman, Policing Domestic Violence: Experiments and Dilemmas. N.Y.: Free Press, 1992. (Winner of 1993-94 Distinguished Scholarship Award, American Sociological Association, Section on Crime, Law and Deviance).
 
 
 
 Lawrence W. Sherman, Scandal and Reform: Controlling Police Corruption. Berkeley: University of California Press (1978) 304 pp.
  [Cited by U. S. Supreme Court in Tennessee v. Garner, 1985]

References

External links

American criminologists
American non-fiction writers
Criminology educators
Gun violence researchers
Denison University alumni
University of Chicago alumni
Yale University alumni
Alumni of Darwin College, Cambridge
Fellows of Darwin College, Cambridge
University of Maryland, College Park faculty
Rutgers University faculty
University of Pennsylvania faculty
Fels Institute of Government
1949 births
Living people
American chief executives
Wolfson Professors of Criminology